This is a list of selected solar eclipses in the Middle Ages, in particular those with historical significance.

Historically significant solar eclipses

Statistics

Longest total eclipses 
Below is a list of all total eclipses longer than 7 minutes that occurred between the 5th and 15th centuries.

Solar eclipses by century

References

+05